Cyperus thorncroftii is a species of sedge that is native to southern parts of Africa.

See also 
 List of Cyperus species

References 

thorncroftii
Plants described in 1927
Flora of South Africa
Flora of Swaziland